Seignalens is a commune in the Aude department in the Occitanie region of southern France.

Demographics

In 2011, the town had 35 residents.

Historic Sites and Monuments 

Church of the Invention de Saint-Etienne Romanesque, rebuilt (partly built with materials reused from the castle): choir vault Romanesque Gothic portal. 
A memorial to the dead was built thanks to a donation from the late Mr. Robert Vidal

See also
Communes of the Aude department

References

Communes of Aude
Aude communes articles needing translation from French Wikipedia